Paolo Boselli (8 June 1838 – 10 March 1932) was an Italian politician who served as the 34th prime minister of Italy during World War I.

Biography
Boselli was born in Savona, Liguria.

Boselli was the first professor of science at the University of Rome prior to entering politics. He served for 51 years as a liberal rightist parliamentary deputy, and as a senator from 1921.

Appointed Minister of Education in 1888, Boselli reorganised the Bank of Italy with his next portfolio, as Minister of the Treasury in 1899. He also served in Sidney Sonnino's 1906 government.

In June 1916 he was a relatively undistinguished center-right politician and one of the oldest members of the Italian parliament, when he was appointed Prime Minister, following the collapse of the Salandra government as a result of military defeats.

His government fell in October 1917 as a result of the military defeat in the Battle of Caporetto, in which Italy lost some 800,000 men, all of the conquest made so far in World War I, as well as Friuli and parts of the Veneto. Boselli had been a strong supporter of commander-in-chief Luigi Cadorna, who was also fired in the aftermath of Caporetto.

During Boselli's time as prime minister, a decree of August 1917 extended the principle of compulsory insurance against accidents to agricultural workers generally.

He died in Rome on 10 March 1932, and was buried in Turin.

References

External links
 Vanda Wilcox: Boselli, Paolo, in: 1914-1918-online. International Encyclopedia of the First World War.

1838 births
1932 deaths
People from Savona
People from the Kingdom of Sardinia
Politicians of Liguria
Historical Right politicians
Liberal Union (Italy) politicians
Italian Liberal Party politicians
National Fascist Party politicians
Prime Ministers of Italy
Finance ministers of Italy
Education ministers of Italy
Government ministers of Italy
Deputies of Legislature XI of the Kingdom of Italy
Deputies of Legislature XII of the Kingdom of Italy
Deputies of Legislature XIII of the Kingdom of Italy
Deputies of Legislature XIV of the Kingdom of Italy
Deputies of Legislature XV of the Kingdom of Italy
Deputies of Legislature XVI of the Kingdom of Italy
Deputies of Legislature XVII of the Kingdom of Italy
Deputies of Legislature XVIII of the Kingdom of Italy
Deputies of Legislature XIX of the Kingdom of Italy
Deputies of Legislature XX of the Kingdom of Italy
Deputies of Legislature XXI of the Kingdom of Italy
Deputies of Legislature XXII of the Kingdom of Italy
Deputies of Legislature XXIII of the Kingdom of Italy
Deputies of Legislature XXIV of the Kingdom of Italy
Deputies of Legislature XXV of the Kingdom of Italy
Italian people of World War I